Facundo "Facu" Campazzo Avedano (born 23 March 1991) is an Argentine professional basketball player for Crvena zvezda of the Adriatic League and the EuroLeague.
He is also a member of the senior Argentina national basketball team.

As a member of the Spanish club Real Madrid, Campazzo won two EuroLeague championships in 2015 and 2018. While representing Argentina, Campazzo won the silver medal at the 2019 FIBA World Cup.

Professional career

Peñarol (2008–2014)
Campazzo began playing for the Argentine League club Peñarol de Mar del Plata in 2008. With Peñarol, he won the following tournaments: the Argentine League championship four times (2010, 2011, 2012, 2014), the Argentine Cup (2010), the Argentine Challenge Cup (2010), the Argentine Super 8 Tournament three times (2009, 2011, 2013), the InterLeagues Tournament twice (2010, 2012), and the FIBA Americas League championship (2010).

He was named the Argentine League Revelation of the Year and the Argentine Cup MVP in 2010. He was named the Argentine Super 8 Tournament MVP in 2011 and 2013 and the Argentine League Most Improved Player in 2012. He was also named the Argentine League Finals MVP in 2012 and 2014.

Real Madrid (2014–2020)
On 30 August 2014, Campazzo signed a three-year deal with the Spanish League club Real Madrid. In the 2014–15 season, Real Madrid won the EuroLeague championship, after defeating the Greek club Olympiacos, by a score of 78–59, in the league's final game. Real Madrid eventually finished the season by winning the Spanish ACB League's 2014–15 season's league playoff finals, after a 3–0 series sweep in the finals series against Barcelona. By winning that title, Real Madrid also won the triple crown.

On 20 August 2015, Campazzo was loaned to Spanish club UCAM Murcia. He spent both the 2015–16 ACB season, and the 2016–17 ACB season with Murcia. He returned to Real Madrid for the 2017–18 ACB season.

In May 2018, Real Madrid won the 2017–18 EuroLeague season's championship after defeating the Turkish club Fenerbahçe Doğuş in the finals, by a score of 85–80. Over 30 EuroLeague games played, Campazzo averaged 7.9 points, 4.5 assists and 2.4 rebounds per game. On 24 May 2018, he finished in fourth place in voting for the Spanish Liga ACB's MVP award of the 2017–18 season.

On 26 June 2018, he re-signed to a three-year deal with Real Madrid. On 3 May 2019, he was named the EuroLeague MVP for the month of April. In the third place game of the 2019 EuroLeague Final Four, Campazzo set an all-time record for assists in a Final Four game, with 15. He surpassed Terrell McIntyre's previous record from 2008.

On 6 February 2020, Campazzo joined Stefan Jović at the top of the EuroLeague's all-time single-game assists chart after he dished out 19 assists in a 103–97 win over the German club Alba Berlin.

Denver Nuggets (2020–2022)
On 30 November 2020, Campazzo was signed by the Denver Nuggets of the NBA to a multiyear contract. On 13 April 2022, Campazzo was suspended for Game 1 of the first round of the 2022 NBA playoffs. The suspension stemmed from him shoving Lakers guard Wayne Ellington in a game three days earlier.

Dallas Mavericks (2022) 
In October 2022, Campazzo signed a contract with the Dallas Mavericks. On 28 November 2022, he was waived when the Mavericks signed guard Kemba Walker.

Crvena zvezda (2022–present)
On 19 December 2022, Campazzo signed a contract with Serbian team Crvena zvezda.

National team career

Junior national team
Campazzo was a member of Argentina's junior national teams. With Argentina's under-16 junior national team, he played at the 2007 FIBA South American Under-16 Championship, where he won a gold medal.

Senior national team
Campazzo competed for the senior Argentina national basketball team at the 2012 London Summer Olympics. He also played for Argentine teams that won gold medals at the 2012 South American Championship and the 2014 South American Games, silver medals at the 2014 South American Championship, the 2015 FIBA Americas Championship, and the 2017 FIBA AmeriCup, and a bronze medal at the 2013 FIBA Americas Championship. He also played with Argentina at the 2014 FIBA World Cup and at the 2016 Rio Summer Olympics.

He helped Argentina bring home a gold medal from the 2019 Pan American tournament, which was held in Lima, Peru. He also won the silver medal at the 2019 FIBA World Cup.

In 2022, Campazzo won the gold medal in the 2022 FIBA AmeriCup held in Recife, Brazil. He was Argentina´s starting point guard in the tournament. After the final game against Brazil, he was named in the All-Tournament Team. 

Campazzo was named to the FIBA AmeriCup's All-Tournament Team in 2013, 2017 and 2022.

Career statistics

NBA

Regular season

|-
| style="text-align:left;"|
| style="text-align:left;"|Denver
| 65 || 19 || 21.9 || .381 || .352 || .879 || 2.1 || 3.6 || 1.2 || .2 || 6.1
|-
| style="text-align:left;"|
| style="text-align:left;"|Denver
| 65 || 4 || 18.2 || .361 || .301 || .769 || 1.8 || 3.4 || 1.0 || .4 || 5.1
|-
| style="text-align:left;"|
| style="text-align:left;"|Dallas
| 8 || 0 || 6.5 || .231 || .273 || .500 || .3 || 1.1 || .8 || .0 || 1.3
|- class="sortbottom"
| style="text-align:center;" colspan="2"| Career
| 138 || 23 || 19.3 || .369 || .326 || .825 || 1.8 || 3.3 || 1.1 || .3 || 5.3

Playoffs

|-
| style="text-align:left;"|2021
| style="text-align:left;"|Denver
| 10 || 9 || 27.0 || .392 || .396 || .842 || 3.0 || 4.1 || 1.4 || .4 || 9.3
|-
| style="text-align:left;"|2022
| style="text-align:left;"|Denver
| 4 || 0 || 3.3 || .000 || .000 || .000 || .8 || .5 || .0 || .0 || .0
|- class="sortbottom"
| style="text-align:center;" colspan="2"|Career
| 14 || 9 || 20.2 || .382 || .380 || .842 || 2.4 || 3.1 || 1.0 || .3 || 6.6

EuroLeague

|-
| style="text-align:left;background:#AFE6BA;"| 2014–15†
| style="text-align:left;" rowspan=5| Real Madrid
| 11 || 1 || 8.6 || .476 || .364 || .700 || .5 || 2.0 || .5 || .1 || 2.8 || 3.0
|-
| style="text-align:left;background:#AFE6BA;"| 2017–18†
| 30 || 28 || 23.1 || .396 || .376 || .833 || 2.4 || 4.5 || 1.4 || .1 || 7.9 || 10.3
|-
| style="text-align:left;"| 2018–19
| 34 || 14 || 23.6 || .385 || .374 || .893 || 2.6 || 5.2 || 1.6 || .0 || 8.7 || 13.0
|-
| style="text-align:left;"| 2019–20
| 28 || 27 || 23.9 || .403 || .310|| .870 || 2.3 || 7.1 || 1.4 || .0 || 9.9 || 15.4
|-
| style="text-align:left;"| 2020–21
| 10 || 7 || 25.4 || .380 || .275 || .826 || 2.5 || 6.7 || 2.0 || .0 || 9.3 || 13.5
|-

Awards and accomplishments

Pro career
FIBA Americas League Champion: 2009–10
4× Argentine League Champion: (2010, 2011, 2012, 2014)
2× Argentine League Finals MVP: (2012, 2014)
3× Argentine Super 8 Tournament Winner: (2009, 2011, 2013)
2× Argentine Super 8 Tournament MVP: (2011, 2013)
2× InterLeagues Tournament Champion: (2010, 2012)
Argentine Cup Winner: (2010)
Argentine Cup MVP: (2010)
Argentine Challenge Cup Winner: (2010)
Argentine League Revelation of the Year: (2010)
3× Argentine League All-Star: (2011, 2012, 2013)
3× Eurobasket.com's Argentine League All-Domestic Players Team: (2012–2014)
3× Eurobasket.com's Argentine League All-Defensive Team: (2012–2014)
3× Argentine League Ideal Quintet Team: (2012, 2013, 2014)
Argentine League Most Improved Player: (2012)
4× Spanish Supercup Winner: (2014, 2018, 2019, 2020)
2× Spanish King's Cup Winner: (2015, 2020)
2× EuroLeague Champion: (2015, 2018)
3× Spanish League Champion: (2015, 2018, 2019)
Triple Crown Winner: (2015)
Eurobasket.com's EuroCup Defensive Player of the Year: (2017)
4× All-Spanish League Team:
2× All-Spanish League Second Team: (2017, 2018)
2× All-Spanish League First Team: (2019, 2020)
Spanish League Most Spectacular Player: (2017)
EuroLeague's MVP of the Month of April: (2019)
Spanish League Finals MVP: (2019)
2× Spanish Supercup MVP: (2019, 2020)
Spanish Cup MVP: (2020)

Argentina junior national team
 2007 FIBA South American Under-16 Championship:

Argentina senior national team
 2012 South American Championship: 
 2013 FIBA Americas Championship: 
 2013 FIBA Americas Championship: All-Tournament Team
 2014 South American Games: 
 2014 South American Championship: 
 2015 FIBA Americas Championship: 
 2017 FIBA AmeriCup: 
 2017 FIBA AmeriCup: All-Tournament Team
 2019 Pan American Games: 
 2019 World Cup: 
 2022 FIBA Americup: 
 2022 FIBA Americup: All-Tournament Team

References

External links

Facundo Campazzo at acb.com 
Facundo Campazzo at acb.com (archive) 
Facundo Campazzo at eurobasket.com
Facundo Campazzo at euroleague.net
Facundo Campazzo at fiba.com (archive)

1991 births
Living people
ABA League players
2014 FIBA Basketball World Cup players
2019 FIBA Basketball World Cup players
Argentine expatriate basketball people in Serbia
Argentine expatriate basketball people in Spain
Argentine expatriate basketball people in the United States
Argentine men's basketball players
Argentine people of Italian descent
Basketball players at the 2012 Summer Olympics
Basketball players at the 2015 Pan American Games
Basketball players at the 2016 Summer Olympics
Basketball players at the 2019 Pan American Games
Basketball players at the 2020 Summer Olympics
CB Murcia players
Competitors at the 2014 South American Games
Dallas Mavericks players
Denver Nuggets players
KK Crvena zvezda players
Liga ACB players
Medalists at the 2019 Pan American Games
National Basketball Association players from Argentina
Olympic basketball players of Argentina
Pan American Games gold medalists for Argentina
Pan American Games medalists in basketball
Peñarol de Mar del Plata basketball players
People from Córdoba, Argentina
Point guards
Real Madrid Baloncesto players
South American Games gold medalists for Argentina
South American Games medalists in basketball
Sportspeople from Córdoba, Argentina
Undrafted National Basketball Association players